Ngọc Hiển is the southernmost rural district of Cà Mau province in the Mekong Delta region of Vietnam. As of 2003 the district had a population of 79,546. The district covers an area of 743 km². The district capital lies at Viên An Đông.

Divisions
The district is divided into the following communes:

Rạch Gốc (urban municipality)
Đất Mũi
Tam Giang Tây
Tân Ân
Tân Ân Tây
Viên An
Viên An Đông

References

Districts of Cà Mau province